"Stop Listening" is a song by British singer-songwriter Tanita Tikaram, which was released in 1998 as the lead single from her sixth studio album The Cappuccino Songs. The song was written by Tikaram and Marco Sabiu, and produced by Sabiu. "Stop Listening" reached No. 67 on the UK Singles Chart and remained in the Top 100 for two weeks.

"Stop Listening" was Tikaram's first recording for her new record label, Mother Records. Included as b-sides on the single are re-recorded "electronic" versions of her hit singles "Good Tradition" and "Twist in My Sobriety", and the previously unreleased "The Feeling Is Gone".

In a 1998 Polydor press release, Tikaram described "Stop Listening" as being "about still loving somebody with whom you have nothing left in common, being pulled this way and that way. Not being able to speak to somebody who you love is so awful."

Critical reception
In a review of The Cappuccino Songs, NME felt the song was "heavy with distress and the imminent threat of Tanita bursting into tears".

Releases
Cassette single (UK)
 "Stop Listening" – 3:54
 "Twist In My Sobriety" – 3:18

CD single (Europe and UK #2)
 "Stop Listening" – 3:54
 "Twist In My Sobriety" – 3:18
 "Good Tradition" – 3:28

CD single (UK #1)
 "Stop Listening" – 3:54
 "The Cappuccino Song" – 3:50
 "Feeling Is Gone" – 3:23
 "Stop Listening" (Directors Cut) – 7:29

12-inch single (UK promo)
 "Stop Listening" (Dub Maraglio) – 5:40
 "Stop Listening"  (Purple Haze Mix) – 5:57
 "Stop Listening" (Directors Cut) – 7:30
 "Stop Listening" (Directors Dub) – 6:25

Charts

References

1998 singles
1998 songs
Tanita Tikaram songs
Songs written by Tanita Tikaram